A list of works by the composer Dane Rudhyar.

Sources:

Compositions

Orchestral works

 Trois Poëmes Ironiques (1914–1919)
 Vision Végétale (1914–1919)
 Four Symphonic Poems (For Métachorie) (1914–1919)
 Dithyrambs (1919)
 Soul Fire (1920)
 Unfoldment (1920)
 Syntony #1 (From the Unreal Lead Us to the Real), a symphonic trilogy (1919–1921)
 The Warrior, a tone poem for piano and orchestra (1920)
 The Surge of Fire (Symphonic Trilogy), for small orchestra (1921–1923)
 Five Stanzas, for string orchestra (1926)
 The Human Way (1927)
 Ouranos, for chamber orchestra (1927)
 Sinfonietta, transcribed from a piano sonatina (1928, rev 1979)
 Threnody (1929)
 Hero Chant (1930)
 Desert Chant (1932)
 Eclogue (1934)
 Epithalamium (1934)
 Threshold of Light (1934)
 Emergence, for string orchestra (1948)
 Triphong (1948, rev 1977)
 Dialogues (1950–57, rev 1977)
 Thresholds, orchestrated in 1975 by George Champion (1954–1955)
 Poems of Youth, trilogy for orchestra (1921–1933, entirely rewritten 1983–1984)
 Cosmic Cycle, trilogy for large orchestra (1981)
 Encounter, a dramatic sequence in five scenes for piano and orchestra (1977)
 Out of the Darkness (Syntonic Drama in Five Acts) (1982)

Chamber music

 Three Melodies, for flute, piano and cello (1918, rev 1974)
 Piano Quintet (1919)
 Three Poems, for violin and piano (1919–1920)
 Three Songs (without words), for flute, violin and piano/harp (1919)
 Violin Sonata (1920)
 Dark Passage, for string quartet (1941)
 Solitude, string quartet (transcribed from Tetragram #4, for piano) (1926)
 Barcarolle, for violin and piano (1954)
 Allehuia, for carillon (1976)
 Nostalgia, for alto flute, piano, and three strings (1979–83)
 Advent (String Quartet #1) (1978)
 Crisis and Overcoming (String Quartet #2) (1979)

Piano works

 Trois Poëmes (1913)
 Cortège Funèbre (1914)
 Tango D'Antan (1914)
 Mosaics, a tone cycle (1918)
 Dithyrambs (1919)
 Spanish Rhythms, for a dance drama (1920)
 Catharsis (1923)
 Moments, 15 tone poems (originally 22) which later became the first three Pentagrams (1924–26)
 Granites: Three Paeans (1925-27)
 Tetragram #1, The Quest (1920)
 Tetragram #2, Crucifixion (1926)
 Tetragram #3, Rebirth (1927)
 Tetragram #4, Adolescence (1925)
 Tetragram #5, Solitude (1927)
 Tetragram #6, Emergence (1929)
 Tetragram #7, Tendrils (1924)
 Tetragram #8, Primavera (1928)
 Tetragram #9, Summer Nights (1967)
 Pentagram #1, The Coming Forth (1924)
 Pentagram #2, The Enfolding (1924)
 Pentagram #3, Release (1926)
 Pentagram #4, The Human Way (1926)
 Syntony (1919–34, rev 1967)
 Thresholds (1954–55)
 Theurgy (Tone Ritual in Five Movements) (1976)
 Transmutation (1976)
 Autumn (1977)
 Three Cantos (1977)
 Epic Poem (1978)
 Rite of Transcendence (1981)
 Processional (1983)

Vocal music

 Trois Chansons de Bilitis, for contralto and harp (1918, rev 1981)
 Trois Poëmes Tragique, for contralto and piano (1918, rev 1979)
 Poem (1918)
 Commune, for baritone or mezzo-soprano and piano (1929)
 Nazaria, scenic music for the "Pilgrimage Play" for piano (1922)
 Affirmation (1930, rev 1981)
 Two Affirmations (1931)
 Three Invocations, for baritone and piano (1939–41)

References

Rudhyar, Dane, compositions by